MaxxBoxx is the name of a line of Macintosh clones produced by MaxxBoxx DataSystems in Germany from July, 1997. The early various models featured single 180-333 MHz PowerPC 604e CPUs all the way up to quad 200 MHz versions and multiple media drive bays for easy expansion. Now MaxxBoxx DataSystems is producing professional high end computers for video editing under Windows and Macintosh.

Models

References
MaxxBoxx: The Biggest, Most Colorful, Least Known Mac Clones, retrieved July 10, 2016
MaxxBoxx DataSystems Index, retrieved May 10, 2007
MaxxBoxx DataSystems, retrieved May 10, 2007
MaxxBoxx DataSystems MacOS-Compatible Systems, retrieved May 10, 2007

Macintosh clones